Live Anywhere is an initiative by Microsoft to bring the Xbox Live online networking service to a wide variety of platforms and devices including Xbox, Xbox 360, Microsoft Windows, Windows Phone, Zune, and more.

LIVE-enabled platforms

The mobile device side of the service has been shown in concept at events such as E3 and CES on devices like a Motorola Q mobile phone, but specific details have not been released.

Since then, Microsoft has unveiled its next generation mobile platform, Windows Phone. Microsoft plans on being more aggressive with mobile Xbox Live-connected games by strictly controlling the phone hardware that Windows Phone runs on, and enabling DirectX 9 graphics for Windows Phone, the same version of DirectX that the Xbox 360 uses.

Live Gamertags are also used for the XNA Creator's Club service.

On April 15, 2010, Xbox Live was shutdown for the original Xbox Console. In October 2011, Xbox Live was shutdown for the Zune.

Features
Single identity (Gamertag/Zune Tag) across all platforms (tied to Windows Live ID)
Cross-platform chat, with text, voice, and video
Unified friends list and message system
Single, worldwide currency for purchasing virtual games, music, videos and content (Microsoft Points)
Cross-platform multiplayer online gaming, including game invites

Pricing
Live is available in two tiers: Silver and Gold. Anybody who signs up to Live is given a Silver account, which offers a basic set of features that differ with each platform. Gold accounts require a subscription, but offer a greater variety of features.

The original Xbox does not recognize Silver accounts, requiring Gold for all Live features (discontinued on April 15, 2010).

Zune Social does not have two tiers, the service is free to all users, though there is a Zune Pass "all-you-can-eat"-style music subscription service that costs $9.99.

Availability
Live is currently available in 220 countries, with more being brought online over time.

See also
Xbox Live
Games for Windows - Live
List of Games for Windows – Live titles
Microsoft Points
Windows Live ID
Windows Phone

External links
Zune Social
ExtremeTech article describing Live Anywhere concept
Video of a Live client running on a mobile device 
Original Xbox Live To Shut Down

References

Games for Windows
Xbox network
Windows Mobile